Big Figure may refer to:

Big Figure, see List of Watchmen characters#Minor characters
The Big Figure (John Martin, born late 1940s), drummer with Dr. Feelgood (band)